Charles Franklin Ogden (February 4, 1873 – April 10, 1933) was a U.S. Representative from Kentucky.

Born in Charlestown, Indiana, Ogden graduated from Jeffersonville High School, Jeffersonville, Indiana. He graduated from the University of Louisville Law School, Louisville, Kentucky, 1896.

He was a lawyer in private practice. He served as member of the Kentucky House of Representatives from 1898 to 1899.
Company H, Eighth Regiment, United States Volunteer Infantry, Spanish–American War.
He was an unsuccessful candidate for county attorney in 1901. He was an unsuccessful candidate for Kentucky state senator in 1902.

Ogden was elected as a Republican to the Sixty-sixth and to the succeeding Congress (March 4, 1919 – March 3, 1923). He was not a candidate for renomination to the Sixty-eighth Congress in 1922.

He died on April 10, 1933, in Louisville, Kentucky.
He was interred in Resthaven Cemetery, Louisville, Kentucky.

References

External links

1873 births
1933 deaths
American volunteer soldiers of the Spanish–American War
University of Louisville School of Law alumni
People from Charlestown, Indiana
Politicians from Louisville, Kentucky
Republican Party members of the Kentucky House of Representatives
Republican Party members of the United States House of Representatives from Kentucky
People from Jeffersonville, Indiana